African-American Jews are people who are both African American and Jewish. African-American Jews may be either Jewish from birth or converts to Judaism. Many African-American Jews are of mixed heritage, having both African-American gentile and non-black Jewish ancestors. Some African-American Jews may identify as Jews of Color.

History 
Jews with African ancestry have lived in the Americas since the colonial era. Before the 1820s, the largest Jewish communities were in the Caribbean, as were the largest communities of Jews with ancestral ties to Africa.

Some early African-American Jews came to the United States from Jamaica and Barbados. The portraits of Sarah Brandon Moses and Isaac Lopez Brandon, both born enslaved in Barbados, are the oldest known paintings of Jews with African Ancestry. Caribbean Jews both became members of white-run Jewish synagogues in the United States and helped form early African American synagogues in Harlem in the first part of the twentieth century. 

Several historic Jewish congregations in the United States mention early African American worshippers. Lucy Marks (?-1838), who lived with and worked for the Marks family of Philadelphia, was known as a "devout observer of the precepts of Judaism" and sat in the women's section of Mikveh Israel during services. Upon her death, the Marks family successfully petitioned to have her buried in the Spruce Street Cemetery, where today she rests in an unmarked grave next to Haym Salomon.  Billy Simmons (?-1860) attended services at Beth Elohim in Charleston, South Carolina, even though its constitution forbade people with African ancestry from being members.   

By the first part of the twentieth century, at least eight different African American run religious organizations self-identified as Jewish. Most traced connections either to the Caribbean or Ethiopia. Today African American Jews worship both in predominantly African-American synagogues and predominantly mixed congregations.

North America
The American Jewish community includes Jews with African-American backgrounds. African-American Jews belong to each of the major American Jewish denominations—Orthodox, Conservative, Reform—and the smaller movements as well, such as Reconstructionist or Humanistic. Like their other Jewish counterparts, there are also African-American Jewish secularists and African-American Jews who may rarely or never take part in religious practices.

Robin Washington, an American journalist and filmmaker, became one of three founders of the National Conference of Black Jews, later called the Alliance of Black Jews. It was conceived to build bridges among all African-American Jews, who are affiliated with many different groups. Estimates of the number of black Jews in the United States range from 20,000 to 200,000.

There are several predominantly African-American synagogues in the United States, such as Beth Shalom B'nai Zaken Ethiopian Hebrew Congregation, which is a synagogue in Chicago, Illinois. The congregation leader of Beth Shalom is Rabbi Capers Funnye. Its assistant rabbis are Avraham Ben Israel and Joshua V. Salter. The congregation, which has about 200 members, is mostly African American. The congregation was started by Rabbi Horace Hasan from Bombay (now Mumbai), India, in 1918 as the Ethiopian Hebrew Settlement Workers Association, and it was influenced by Wentworth Arthur Matthew's Commandment Keepers.

See also

Alliance of Black Jews
African American–Jewish relations
History of the Jews in Suriname
Jewish diaspora
Jewish ethnic divisions
List of African-American Jews
Black Jews in New York City
Black, White, and Jewish

References

Further reading

External links
, a site for "Black American Jews and their friends to communicate".
 at Temple University, a "research and learning institution dedicated to scholarship on Afro-Jewish peoples and developing awareness of the historical, political, religious, and philosophical issues that arise from the convergence of the African and Jewish diasporas".
, a group whose mission is "to build a community of Jews of color and multiracial Jewish families".

News and articles